The 2013 Clemson Tigers football team represented Clemson University in the 2013 NCAA Division I FBS football season. The Tigers were led by head coach Dabo Swinney in his fifth full year and sixth overall since taking over midway through 2008 season. They played their home games at Memorial Stadium, also known as "Death Valley". They were members of the Atlantic Division of the Atlantic Coast Conference. They finished the season 11–2, 7–1 in ACC play to finish in second place in the Atlantic Division. They were invited to the Orange Bowl where they defeated Ohio State.

Personnel

Coaching staff

Schedule

Depth chart

Recruiting class

Game summaries

Georgia

South Carolina State

NC State

Wake Forest

Syracuse

Boston College

Florida State

Maryland

Virginia

Georgia Tech

The Citadel

South Carolina

Ohio State (Orange Bowl)

Rankings

2014 NFL draft
Clemson had five players selected in the 2014 NFL draft.  Sammy Watkins went in the first round as the fourth overall pick, tied for the highest NFL draft pick in Clemson football history.

Undrafted signees
Along with the five draft picks, Clemson had four more players make the NFL as undrafted free agents.

References

Clemson
Clemson Tigers football seasons
Orange Bowl champion seasons
Clemson Tigers football